An ARRL Numbered Radiogram is a brevity code used in composing ARRL Radiograms during times of radio congestion.

The code is used to transmit standard messages, sometimes with customized text, very quickly by experienced ARRL National Traffic System (NTS) message traffic handlers.

In use, ARRL Numbered Radiograms are messages encoded as one or two numbers. The numbers are always written down as words, and are always preceded by the procedure word "ARL". Throughout their transit in the Amateur radio National Traffic System, they retain this format and are only expanded to their plain-English meaning when delivered by a Ham. For example, "ARL FORTY-SIX" would be typed in a letter or spoken over the phone to the addressee as "Greetings on your birthday and best wishes for many more to come." For those codes where customized text can be added, the customized text is added immediately following the number code word. For example, "ARL SIXTY TWO CHRISTMAS" is expanded upon delivery outside of the NTS System as "Greetings and best wishes to you for a pleasant Christmas holiday season.".

See also
 Amateur radio
 American Radio Relay League
 ARRL Radiogram
 National Traffic System

References

Brevity codes
Amateur radio